Fily Dabo Sissoko was a Malian writer and political leader, born 15 May 1900 at Horokoto (French Soudan, now in Mali's  Bafoulabé Cercle).  He died 30 June 1964, imprisoned at Kidal.  Fily Dabo Sissoko is chiefly remembered as one of the most influential political leaders of pre-independence Mali, primary conservative rival to Mali's first President Modibo Keita, and an influential writer of the Negritude movement.

Early life 
Sissoko was of Khassonké ethnicity and he was the son of a local traditional ruler, Dabo Sissoko received his primary education at nearby Bafoulabé, before winning a place at the elite École normale supérieure William Ponty in Gorée (Senegal).

He was a teacher at the Bafoulabé Regional school until he succeeded his father and became "chef de canton" of Niambia in 1933. Sissoko took part in French politics, supporting the Front populaire government on the 1930s and the Resistance during the Second World War. He received the Médaille de la Résistance after the war.

Political career 
In October 1945 he was elected deputy to the French Constitutional Assembly representing the Soudan-Niger non-citizen constituency. He was a member of the Republican and Resistance Union (URR). Sissoko was elected in a run-off, with 45.8% (1,277) of the vote. In the Constituent Assembly he joined the communist group and he was re-elected in the June and November elections of 1946. After the November 1946 election, he joined the SFIO group.

Dabo Sissoko was re-elected to that seat in 1951 and 1956. He was briefly French Under Secretary of State for Industry And Commerce, a Ministerial position in the second government of Robert Schuman (5 to 11 November 1948).

With Hamadoun Dicko, another former canton chief, Fily Dabo Sissoko founded in December 1945 the Parti progressiste soudanais (PSP). This was a conservative party led by African traditional rulers (including Sissoko), African officials of the French colonial administration, and the French government. The party sought gradual independence from France to preserve the influence of traditional elites. In 1957, in regional elections, the PSP was dealt its first major electoral defeat at the hands of the Union soudanaise-Rassemblement démocratique africain (US/RDA) of Modibo Keïta. Until the fusion of the parties on the eve of independence in 1959, Fily Dabo Sissoko vigorously opposed the socialist political program of Modibo Keïta. Unsurprisingly, following Mali's 1960 independence, Modibo Keïta became leader.  Following riots in 1962 by some business interests opposing the creation of the Malian franc (independent of the CFA Franc used by other former colonies), Dabo Sissoko was arrested and charged with sedition. Condemned to death after being found guilty an 'attempt to destabilize the state', Dabo Sissoko had his sentence commuted to life imprisonment. Imprisoned near Kidal he died under still controversial and unclear circumstances in 1964.

Writer 
Parallel to his political career, Dabo Sissoko became a well-known poet, essayist, and popular author.  Associated with the Negritude movement, Dabo Sissoko helped form a Malian cultural identity, drawing from a range of ethnicities and oral literary traditions.

Bibliography
 1936 : La Politesse et la civilité des Noirs (essai publié dans le Bulletin de la recherche du Soudan)
 1950 : Les Noirs et la culture : Introduction aux problèmes de l’évolution des peuples noirs (essai publié à New York)
 1953 : Crayons et portraits (poems, Mulhouse, Imprimerie Union)
 1953 : Harmakhis, poèmes du terroir africain (poems, Paris, Éditions de la Tour du Guet)
 1955 : Sagesse noire, sentences et poèmes malinkés (poems, Paris, Éditions de la Tour du Guet)
 1955 : La passion de Djimé (novel, Paris, Éditions de la Tour du Guet)
 1957 : Coup de sagaie, controverse sur l’Union française (essay, Éditions La Tour du Guet, Paris,)
 1959 : Une page est tournée (essay, Dakar, Diop)
 1962 : La savane rouge (Avignon, Presses universelles)
 1963 : Poèmes de l’Afrique noire (poems, Paris, Éditions Debresse)
 1970 : Les Jeux de destin (poems, Paris, Éditions Jean Grassin)
 1970 : Au-dessus des nuages de Madagascar au Kenya (poems, Paris, Éditions Jean Grassin)

References

Sources
 Fily Dabo Sissoko, Online Larousse Encyclopedia, extracted from Dictionnaire mondial des littératures.  Larouse, Paris.
 
  Jacques Chevrier, L’œuvre méconnue de Fily Dabo Sissoko, 34-37 (PDF)
  page on the French National Assembly website
 2nd page on the French National Assembly website

Further reading 
 Sébastien Denjean, Fily Dabo Sissoko, Mémoire de DEA, Centre d'études d'Afrique noire, 1994.
 Singare Salamatou Maïga, A la découverte de l'oeuvre littéraire de Fily Dabo Sissoko: thématique et poétique, Thèse de doctorat, Université de Cergy Pontoise, 1999, 418 p.
 Mamadou Lamine Diawara, Fily-Dabo Sissoko ou la malédiction de Saara Minyamba,  Nouvelles Du Sud, 2000.

External links 

 BEROSE - International Encyclopaedia of the Histories of Anthropology. "Dabo Sissoko, Fily (1900-1964)", Paris. (ISSN 2648-2770)

1900 births
1964 deaths
People from Kayes Region
People of French West Africa
Union progressiste politicians
French Section of the Workers' International politicians
Sudanese Regroupment Party politicians
Members of the Constituent Assembly of France (1945)
Members of the Constituent Assembly of France (1946)
Deputies of the 1st National Assembly of the French Fourth Republic
Deputies of the 2nd National Assembly of the French Fourth Republic
Deputies of the 3rd National Assembly of the French Fourth Republic
Deputies of the 1st National Assembly of the French Fifth Republic
Malian writers
Malian poets
Malian male writers
Male poets
20th-century poets
20th-century male writers
Recipients of the Resistance Medal
Prisoners and detainees of Mali
Malian prisoners sentenced to death